Luca Grimaldi (Genoa, 1675 - Genoa, 1750) was the 149th Doge of the Republic of Genoa and king of Corsica.

Biography 
During his mandate as Doge. Grimaldi promoted two public works for the Genoese city and the readjustment of the donkey-back water conduit for the supply of the republican capital. He ended the dogate on January 22, 1730, but would continue to serve the republic in other state jobs. Grimaldi died in Genoa in 1750.

See also 

 Republic of Genoa
 Doge of Genoa
 House of Grimaldi

Sources 

 Buonadonna, Sergio. Rosso doge. I dogi della Repubblica di Genova dal 1339 al 1797.

18th-century Doges of Genoa
1675 births
1750 deaths

House of Grimaldi